Big Game is a 1921 American silent drama film directed by Dallas M. Fitzgerald and starring May Allison, Forrest Stanley and Edward Cecil.

Cast
 May Allison as Eleanor Winthrop 
 Forrest Stanley as Larry Winthrop
 Edward Cecil as Jean St. Jean
 Zeffie Tilbury as Aunt Sarah Winthrop
 William Elmer as Spike McGafney
 Sidney D'Albrook as Henri Baptiste

References

Bibliography
 Munden, Kenneth White. The American Film Institute Catalog of Motion Pictures Produced in the United States, Part 1. University of California Press, 1997.

External links
 

1921 films
1921 drama films
1920s English-language films
American silent feature films
Silent American drama films
Films directed by Dallas M. Fitzgerald
American black-and-white films
Metro Pictures films
1920s American films